XHGN-FM is a radio station on 95.3 FM in Piedras Negras, Veracruz, known as La Gigante.

History
XEGN-AM 1500 received its concession on March 5, 1973. It was a 250-watt daytimer owned by Amando Alarcón Ruiz. In the 1990s, it moved to 1180 kHz with 10,000 watts day and 1,000 night.

XEGN moved to FM in 2010 as XHGN-FM 95.3.

References

Radio stations in Veracruz
Radio stations established in 1973